Athol Yardley Meyer (28 November 1940 – 31 July 1998) was an Australian journalist and, later, politician.

He was born in Dunedin, New Zealand, but moved to Sydney to work at the ABC. He was later posted to Hobart, Tasmania.

Following work and private travel in the UK and mainland Europe in the mid 1960s, Meyer was posted as an ABC foreign correspondent to Port Moresby (1968-1970) and Kuala Lumpur (1970–72).  During his posting in KL, Meyer undertook several assignments in Vietnam, working closely with ABC cameraman Willie Phua (https://www.youtube.com/watch?v=vkck39jSV-M) . Meyer and Phua covered preparations for a new Tet offensive and came under fire in the central highlands.

In 1986 he was elected to the Tasmanian Legislative Council as the independent member for Huon. He served as Chair of Committees from 1993 to 1996. He resigned from the Legislative Council in 1996 having been diagnosed with cancer, to which he succumbed in 1998 at Little Swanport.

References

1940 births
1998 deaths
Independent members of the Parliament of Tasmania
Members of the Tasmanian Legislative Council
20th-century Australian politicians
New Zealand emigrants to Australia
Politicians from Dunedin